Ashland is a town in Pittsburg County, Oklahoma, United States.  The population was 66 at the 2010 census.

History 
Residents of the young community applied for a United States Post Office to be established using the name "Pearl City."  Postal officials did not agree to their choice of names, doubtless because of the existence of a post office at Pearl in Woodward County, Oklahoma Territory.  Federal officials were already anticipating the union of the "twin territories" into a single state, and postal officials did not want two post offices in the same state using such similar names.  They substituted Ashland instead, and a post office opened at Ashland, Indian Territory on October 1, 1902.  At the time of its founding, Ashland was located in Tobucksy County, Choctaw Nation.

Geography
Ashland is located at  (34.768133, -96.069752).

Demographics

As of the census of 2010, there were 66 people living in the town. The racial makeup of the town was 60.38% White, 26.42% Native American, and 13.21% from two or more races. Hispanic or Latino of any race were 5.66% of the population.

There were 19 households, out of which 47.4% had children under the age of 18 living with them, 57.9% were married couples living together, 21.1% had a female householder with no husband present, and 21.1% were non-families. 15.8% of all households were made up of individuals, and 10.5% had someone living alone who was 65 years of age or older. The average household size was 2.79 and the average family size was 3.07.

In the town, the population was spread out, with 30.2% under the age of 18, 13.2% from 18 to 24, 26.4% from 25 to 44, 15.1% from 45 to 64, and 15.1% who were 65 years of age or older. The median age was 30 years. For every 100 females, there were 130.4 males. For every 100 females age 18 and over, there were 117.6 males.

The median income for a household in the town was $30,833, and the median income for a family was $30,417. Males had a median income of $24,375 versus $0 for females. The per capita income for the town was $6,981. There were 20.0% of families and 19.2% of the population living below the poverty line, including 26.7% of under eighteens and 16.7% of those over 64.

References

External links
 Encyclopedia of Oklahoma History and Culture - Ashland

Towns in Pittsburg County, Oklahoma
Towns in Oklahoma